The Christian National Agricultural Workers' and Civic Party, more commonly known as the Andrássy-Friedrich Party (AFP) after the leaders, Gyula Andrássy the Younger and István Friedrich, was a political party in Hungary during the early 1920s.

History
The party first contested national elections in 1922, winning eleven seats in the parliamentary elections that year, making it the third largest faction in Parliament.

Despite the party's success, it did not contest any further elections.

References

Defunct political parties in Hungary
Catholic political parties
Christian political parties in Hungary